The Marcapata District is one of the twelve districts in the Quispicanchi Province in Peru. Created on January 20, 1869, its capital is Marcapata.

Geography 
The Willkanuta mountain range traverses the province. Some of the highest peaks of the district are Chumpi, Hatun Ñañu Punta, Wila Jaqhi and Yayamari. Other mountains are listed below:

Ethnic groups 
The people in the district are mainly indigenous citizens of Quechua descent. Quechua is the language which the majority of the population (87.29%) learnt to speak in childhood, 12.33% of the residents started speaking using the Spanish language (2007 Peru Census).

See also 
 Q'umirqucha (Q'umir Qucha)
 Q'umirqucha (Yanaq Qusqu K'uchu)

References  

  Instituto Nacional de Estadística e Informática. Departamento Cusco. Retrieved on November 2, 2007.